"Whatever Doesn't Kill Me" is the second single from Canadian alternative rock band Finger Eleven's sixth album Life Turns Electric. It was released in February 2011.

Chart performance
The single peaked at number 63 on the Billboard Canadian Hot 100 chart on 12 February 2011, spending a total of 12 weeks on the chart.

See also
 Stronger (What Doesn't Kill You) (Kelly Clarkson)

References 

2011 singles
Finger Eleven songs
Wind-up Records singles
2010 songs
Number-one singles in Canada